MacPherson v. Buick Motor Co., 217 N.Y. 382, 111 N.E. 1050 (1916) is a famous New York Court of Appeals opinion by Judge Benjamin N. Cardozo that removed the requirement of privity of contract for duty in negligence actions.

Facts
The plaintiff, Donald C. MacPherson, a stonecutter, was injured when one of the wooden wheels of his 1909 Buick Runabout collapsed. The defendant, Buick Motor Company, had manufactured the vehicle but not the wheel, which had been manufactured by another party but installed by defendant. It was conceded that the defective wheel could have been discovered upon inspection. The defendant denied liability because the plaintiff had purchased the automobile from a dealer, rather than directly from the defendant.

Judgment
In the earlier precedent, duty had been imposed on defendants by voluntary contract via privity as in an English case, Winterbottom v. Wright.   which is the precursor rule for product liability. The portion of the MacPherson opinion in which Cardozo demolished the privity bar to recovery is as follows:

See also
Donoghue v Stevenson [1932] AC 562, where Lord Atkin cited the decision with approval in the House of Lords.

Notes

External links

New York (state) state case law
United States tort case law
1916 in United States case law
Product liability case law
1916 in New York (state)
Buick
General Motors litigation